Richárd Jelena (born 8 January 1998) is a Hungarian professional footballer who plays for Liga II side FK Csíkszereda.

Career statistics
.

References
 
 

1998 births
Living people
People from Pécs
Hungarian footballers
Association football forwards
Budapest Honvéd FC players
Paksi FC players
Csákvári TK players
Zalaegerszegi TE players
Mosonmagyaróvári TE 1904 footballers
Kozármisleny SE footballers
Kisvárda FC players
Nemzeti Bajnokság I players
Liga II players
FK Csíkszereda Miercurea Ciuc players
Hungarian expatriate footballers
Hungarian expatriate sportspeople in Romania
Expatriate footballers in Romania